Leyti (also, Ashagy-Gendob, Löyti, and Leyty) is a village and the least populous municipality in the Davachi Rayon of Azerbaijan.  It has a population of 140.

References 

Populated places in Shabran District